The Poster Museum at Wilanów is the world's oldest poster museum. Founded in 1968, the museum is housed at the Wilanów Palace complex in Warsaw, Poland.

History
The Poster Museum at Wilanów is part of the National Museum in Warsaw. It was established through a grant of several thousand posters belonging to the National Museum, made by the Museum's Director, Stanislav Lorentz. The Poster Museum opened in June 1968, becoming the world's first museum dedicated to this art form.

At its founding, the Museum had 13,000 items in its collection, including around 500 posters preserved from the World War II era. Its collection is continually growing, through gifts from Polish and international donors.

During the mid-20th century, Polish interest in poster art, and poster collecting, grew substantially, influenced by the visual style of national filmmakers such as Andrzej Wajda. Collectors sought posters advertising films, plays, and musicals in particular. Warsaw's annual poster art competition gained a worldwide reputation, ultimately leading the founding of the Poster Museum in 1968.

The Poster Museum is housed in a modern exhibition space erected behind the historic Wilanów Palace, a 19th-century riding school located on the outskirts of Warsaw.

Collections

More than 55,000 posters are in the collections of the Poster Museum at Wilanów. 30,000 items represent the history of poster art in Poland from 1892 to 2002. The Poster Museum houses one of the world's largest collections of posters. The Museum rotates its collection through permanent exhibits on Polish poster art and history, foreign poster art, and thematic exhibits.

International Poster Biennale in Warsaw
The International Poster Biennale in Warsaw, which was launched in 1966, moved to the Museum in 1994, where it is still held every second year. The International Poster Biennale was the world's first poster biennale. Today, it attracts more than 2000 entries from around the globe when it is held.

The 23rd International Poster Biennale takes place in 2012.

In 2016, on the occasion of the 50th Anniversary of International Poster Biennale, 25th IPBW invited fifty eminent artists to take part in the exhibition 50/50/50. Their work reproduced in the form of digital print in city light boxes situated in Warsaw.

List of 50/50/50 Participants:

Takashi Akiyama, Japan / Dimitris Arvanitis, Greece / Peter Bankow, Russia / Michał Batory, France / Anthon Beeke, Netherland / Tomasz Bogusławski, Poland / Michel Bouvet, France / Stephan Bundi, Switzerland / Seymur Chwast, USA / cyan, Germany / Lex Drewiński, Poland / Cao Fang, China / El Fantasma de Heredia (Anabella Salem, Gabriel Mateu), Argentina / Milton Glaser, USA / Mark Gowing, Australia / Igor Gurowicz, Russia / Małgorzata Gurowska, Poland / Jianping He, Germany / Michele Miyares Hollands, Cuba / Leszek Hołdanowicz, Poland / Homework (Joanna Górska, Jerzy Skakun), Poland / Radovan Jenko, Slovenia / Han Jiaying, China / Roman Kalarus, Poland / Andrzej Klimowski, Great Britain / Andrzej Krauze, Marcin Mroszczak, Poland / Yossi Lemel, Israel / Andrew Lewis, Canada/Harmen Liemburg, Netherland/Uwe Loesch, Germany/Andriej Logwin, Russia / Pekka Loiri, Finland/Alejandro Magallanes, Mexico / Javier Mariscal, Spain/Shin Matsuunaga, Japan/Holger Matthies, Germany / Konstantinos Miaris, Greece/Karel Míšek, Czech Republic/Piotr Młodożeniec, Poland / German Montalvo, Mexico / Finn Nygaard, Denmark / István Orosz, Hungary / :fr:Kari Piippo, Finland / Władysław Pluta, Poland / Péter Pócs, Hungary / Alain Le Quernec, France / Gunter Rambow, Germany / Wiesław Rosocha, Poland/ Thierry Sarfis, France / Paula Scher, USA / Ralph Schraivogel, Switzerland / Nancy Skolos, Thomas Wedell, USA / Leonardo Sonnoli, Italy / Jakub Stępień, Poland / David Tartakover, Israel / Parisa Tashakori, Iran / Niklaus Troxler, Switzerland / U.G. Sato, Japan / Henning Wagenbreth, Germany / Mieczysław Wasilewski, Poland / Catherine Zask, France

See also

 Books on posters
 Graphic design
 Illustrations
 Mediascape
 Pin-up (disambiguation)
 Polish School of Posters
 Poster session
 Street Poster Art
 Swann Galleries

References

 Plakaty w zbiorach Muzeum Plakatu w Wilanowie ed. Maria Kurpik, Agata Szydłowska, Muzeum Narodowe w Warszawie, Warszawa 2008, pp. 293. 

 Maria Kurpik: Chopin - polski plakat, Wydawnictwo Bosz, Olszanica 2010, pp. 160. 

 Maria Kurpik: Polonia 1900-1939. Fondos del Museo del Cartel de Wilanów, Museo MuVIM, Valencia 2006, pp. 223. 

 L'Affiche Polonaise de 1945 à 2004. Des slogans et des signes, ed. Jean-Claud Famulicki, Maria Kurpik, La Decouverte, Paris 2005, pp. 192.

External links
Poster Museum, Wilanów within Google Arts & Culture

Graphic design
 
Museums in Warsaw
Art museums and galleries in Poland
National museums of Poland
Design museums
Museums established in 1968
1968 establishments in Poland
Poster museums